Phoenix Subdivision may refer to:
Phoenix Subdivision (BNSF Railway)
Phoenix Subdivision (Union Pacific Railroad)